Donald Elliott Heinkel (born October 20, 1959) is a retired Major League Baseball pitcher. He played during two seasons at the Major League level for the Detroit Tigers and St. Louis Cardinals. Heinkel notched his lone major league save on April 29, 1988. He went 2 scoreless innings to preserve a 9–6 victory over the Mariners. He was drafted by the Tigers in the 30th round of the 1982 amateur draft. Heinkel played his first professional season with their Rookie league Bristol Tigers, Class A-Advanced Lakeland Tigers, and Double-A Birmingham Barons in 1982, and his last with the San Diego Padres' Double-A Wichita Wranglers in 1993.

Heinkel now resides in Alabama with his wife and 11 children. He practices medicine in the Muscle Shoals, Alabama area.

References

Sources

Baseball Gauge
Venezuelan Professional Baseball League

1959 births
Living people
Alacranes de Campeche players
All-American college baseball players
Baseball players from Wisconsin
Birmingham Barons players
Bristol Tigers players
Canton-Akron Indians players
National College Baseball Hall of Fame inductees
Detroit Tigers players
Evansville Triplets players
Glens Falls Tigers players
Lakeland Tigers players
Leones del Caracas players
American expatriate baseball players in Venezuela
Louisville Redbirds players
Major League Baseball pitchers
Nashville Sounds players
Rimini Baseball Club players
American expatriate baseball players in Italy
St. Paul Saints players
St. Louis Cardinals players
Sportspeople from Racine, Wisconsin
Sportspeople from the Milwaukee metropolitan area
Toledo Mud Hens players
Wichita State Shockers baseball players
Wichita State University alumni
Wichita Wranglers players
Alaska Goldpanners of Fairbanks players